The hunchback amphipod, Iphimedia gibba, is a species of amphipod crustacean. It is a marine arthropod in the family Iphimediidae. It was first described in 1955 by Keppel Harcourt Barnard as Cypsiphimedia gibba.

Distribution
This species is found off the South African coast from the Cape Peninsula to Port Elizabeth, from the subtidal down to at least .

Description
It is vividly striped in blue and yellow. It has blue sideplates. The body is hunched so that the head faces downwards.

References

Gammaridea
Crustaceans described in 1940